The Arizona Hawks is a United States Australian Football League team, based in Arizona, United States. It was founded in 1999, becoming the first Australian rules football club in Arizona. The club also fields 9 a side teams in the Arizona Footy League including both men's and women's team. The women's side is known as the Lady Hawks.

The Hawks have won the USAFL National Championships Men's Div 2 Grand Final in 2004 and the Men's Div 3 Grand Final in 2011 and were runners up in the Women's Div 1 Grand Final in 2007.

Arizona Hawk Dani Marshall was drafted to the AFLW in 2020 to play the sport professionally in Australia.

References

External links
 

Australian rules football clubs in the United States
Sports in Phoenix, Arizona
Australian rules football clubs established in 1999
1999 establishments in Arizona
Sports in Mesa, Arizona